Manuel Pami Costa (born 5 February 1999) is a Bissau-Guinean professional footballer who plays as a midfielder for Differdange 03 and the Guinea-Bissau national team.

Club career
Pami is a youth product of EAS Póvoa de Santa Iria, Povoense, Sporting CP and Vitória Guimarães. He began his senior career with the reserves of Chaves in 2017. The following season, he had a one-year stint with Ideal before moving to Canelas 2010 in 2019. On 12 June 2020, he transferred to Varzim. He returned to Canelas 2010 on loan for 2 seasons starting on 21 December 2020. In June 2022, he transferred to the Luxembourgian club Differdange 03.

International career
Pami made his international debut with the Guinea-Bissau national team in a friendly 1–1 tie with Martinique on 24 September 2022.

References

External links
 
 

1999 births
Living people
Sportspeople from Bissau
Bissau-Guinean footballers
Guinea-Bissau international footballers
Association football midfielders
G.D. Chaves players
S.C. Ideal players
Varzim S.C. players
FC Differdange 03 players
Campeonato de Portugal (league) players
Luxembourg National Division players
Bissau-Guinean expatriate footballers
Bissau-Guinean expatriates in Portugal
Expatriate footballers in Portugal
Bissau-Guinean expatriates in Luxembourg
Expatriate footballers in Luxembourg